The Daqing Oil Field, formerly romanized as "Taching", is the largest oil field in the People's Republic of China, located between the Songhua river and Nen River in Heilongjiang province. When the Chinese government began to use pinyin for romanization, the field's name became known as Daqing.

History
Discovered in 1959 by Li Siguang, Wang Jinxi (who led No. 1205 drilling team) worked on this oilfield. Due to the rapid increases in production in its early days, Daqing was lauded by China's state media as a model industrial enterprise throughout the 1960s and 1970s.

It is reputed that during the first two decades of the life of the field, as much as 90% of the oil was wasted.

Daqing Oilfield Company Limited, based in Daqing, is the operator of exploration and development of Daqing Oilfield. From 2004, the company plans to cut its crude oil output by an annual 7% for the next seven years to extend the life of Daqing.

Output of barrels of oil equivalent of the Daqing Field remained stable at over 40 million tons in 2012, while output at Changqing oil field was over 42 million tons, making it the most productive oil and gas field in China.

Crude output from the ageing Daqing oilfield is in decline even though the CNPC deployed some non-traditional drilling techniques. In 2019, output fell to 30.9 million tonnes from 32 million tonnes in 2018. At its peak in 2008, output stood at 40 million tonnes a year.
The production was 30 million tonnes in 2021. 

A new shale oil field was discovered in Daqing Oilfield in 2021, with an estimated geological reserve of 1.268 billion tons

In popular culture
It is featured as a map in first-person shooter video game Battlefield 2.

It was also featured in a dedicated part of the How Yukong Moved the Mountains documentary, "About Petroleum".

See also

List of oil fields

References

Oil fields in China
Geography of Heilongjiang
Daqing